Aleksei Arefyev (born 9 March 1971) is a Russian retired professional footballer. He made his professional debut in the Soviet Top League in 1989 for FC Torpedo Moscow. He played 4 games in the UEFA Cup 1992–93 for FC Torpedo Moscow.

Honours
 Soviet Top League bronze: 1991.
 Russian Cup winner: 1993.

References

1971 births
Footballers from Moscow
Living people
Soviet footballers
Russian footballers
Soviet Top League players
Russian Premier League players
Russian expatriate sportspeople in Bangladesh
FC Torpedo Moscow players
FC Torpedo-2 players
FC Ural Yekaterinburg players
FC Lokomotiv Nizhny Novgorod players
Expatriate footballers in Bangladesh

Association football midfielders
Association football defenders